The Telltale Clue, sometimes billed as The Tell-Tale Clue, is an American police drama that aired on CBS Television on Thursday nights at 10pm ET from July 18, 1954, to September 23, 1954. The Public Defender aired on CBS in the same time slot from March to June 1954, and resumed the same time slot from September 30 until the end of the run in June 1955.

The program was produced by Charles E. Martin (1910-1983), and sponsored by Philip Morris cigarettes. At least two episodes were written by novelist and essayist Gore Vidal.

Synopsis
The series centered on Det. Lt. Richard Hale, the head of the criminology department of the police department of an unnamed city, who used scientific equipment and analytical skills to solve 'perfect crimes'.

Cast
Guest stars included Anthony Ross as Det. Lt. Richard Hale and Darren McGavin.

Preservation status
Two episodes are available on YouTube, see CTVA entry at External Links.

References

External links
The Telltale Clue at CTVA
Two complete unedited episodes to watch

CBS original programming
1950s American crime drama television series
1954 American television series debuts
1954 American television series endings
Black-and-white American television shows